Black Women Organized for Political Action (BWOPA) was founded in 1968 in California after branching off from the Bay Area Women for Dellums, a group of 12 politically active women who were involved in fundraising for Ron Dellums run for congressional office. It is now a 501 c4 nonprofit advocacy organization. Their mission is to encourage African American women to be more involved in politics so that action can be taken to address their oppressions. The goal of the organization is to focus on the intersectionality of issues pertaining to race and gender by encouraging African American women to become involved in the political process. Dezie Woods-Jones was elected the first president of the organization in 1970. Woods dedicated her life to addressing issues concerning education, poverty, female empowerment, and disenchantment. BWOPA focuses on addressing its three branches: operations, political advocacy, and education.

History 
Black Women Organized for Political Action was founded in 1968 after expanding from a smaller group called the Bay Area Women for Dellums. The group was formed by 12 women in the Bay Area of California. Until 1970, the group functioned under co-chairs. In 1970, however, they elected their first president Dezie Woods-Jones. Aileen Hernandez is one of the women credited with founding this organization.

Leadership 
Dezie Woods-Jones was the first president of Black Women Organized for Political Action. In addition to her involvement in BWOPA, she was a community activist for over 40 years. In her years of activism, she served as a city council member in Oakland, Vice Mayor of Oakland, and president of BWOPA for 30 years. Through her involvement, BWOPA's political action resulted in the election of other women who were the first African American women representatives in their areas. Ella Hill Hutch was a charter member of Black Women Organized for Political Action.

Mission 
Black Women Organized for Political Action’s mission is to motivate and support African American women to involve themselves in the political process. They provide leadership training to help women develop strategies, articulate injustices to African American women, and form networks. The core issues of their focus are health, education, criminal justice, and economic security.
 Health - BWOPA strives to raise awareness of the health disparities in the health system and advocate for political action that will give African American women more accessible health care. Their goal within the health sector is to spread awareness and advocate for policies to increase access to quality care.
 Education - BWOPA advocates for political action that will increase the rates of African American high school graduation and college completion rates. They are focused on improving access to early education, safe school environments, high-quality education, and more support for funding for schools.
 Criminal Justice Reform - BWOPA is concerned with reducing the high rates of African American incarceration by providing alternatives to incarceration for youths, encourage rehabilitation and assistance in reintegrating after incarceration.
 Economic Security - BWOPA aims to reduce the disparity of African American unemployment rates by providing job training, financial education, and support for entrepreneurship.

References 

1968 establishments in California